The MLS is Back Tournament Final, known as the MLS is Back Tournament Final presented by Wells Fargo for sponsorship reasons, was a soccer match held on August 11, 2020 at the ESPN Wide World of Sports Complex near Orlando, Florida. It was the final match of the MLS is Back Tournament, a competition marking the resumption of the 2020 Major League Soccer season following the initial wave of the COVID-19 pandemic. The match was played behind closed doors due to the pandemic and was broadcast on ESPN beginning at 8:00 p.m. Eastern Time.

Portland Timbers won the match 2–1 to win the MLS is Back Tournament and were presented the trophy after the game. As winners, Portland received $300,000 in prize money and also earned a spot in the 2021 CONCACAF Champions League. They qualified for the United States' third berth, replacing the 2020 MLS Eastern or Western Conference regular season champions which are not the Supporters' Shield champions.

The match was the first MLS final refereed by a woman, with Kathryn Nesbitt acting as an Assistant Referee.

Road to the final

Match
Portland played in a defensive posture for much of the game, allowing Orlando 64% of the possession but not letting them get into good shooting positions. In the 27th minute Portland scored first, with Larrys Mabiala scoring a header from a free kick by Diego Valeri. Orlando responded with a goal 12 minutes later via a move to the end-line by Nani and a pass to the near post that Mauricio Pereyra finished. Portland scored again about 3/4 of the way through the game; Valeri sent a corner kick to Eryk Williamson, who controlled the ball and sent it toward goal, where Jeremy Ebobisse redirected it to Dario Župarić for a tap-in through Nani's legs. Both of Portland's goals were scored by center backs. The game opened up after that, with Orlando committing more players forward in an attempt to level the score, but Portland's defense continued to hold them off until the final whistle. The game finished with Orlando having only one shot on goal – namely their goal – while Portland had six.

Details

Broadcasting
The match was broadcast on ESPN.

Notes

References

External links
 MLS is Back Tournament

2020 Major League Soccer season
Portland Timbers matches
Orlando City SC matches
2020 in sports in Florida
August 2020 sports events in the United States
Sports competitions in Florida
Soccer in Florida